The Kamarupa inscriptions are a number of 5th-century to early 13th-century rock, copper plate and clay seal inscriptions associated with the rulers and their subordinates of the Kamarupa region.  The common language of these inscriptions is Sanskrit.  The earliest of these inscriptions, the Umachal and Nagajari-Khanikargaon rock inscriptions, belong to the 5th century and written in a script which was nearly identical to the eastern variety of the Gupta script.  There is a steady evolution in the script over the centuries, and last of the scripts, for example the Kanai-boroxiboa inscription using a proto-Assamese script.  The script in this period is called the Kamarupi script, which continues development as the Medieval Assamese script from the 13th to the 19th century and emerges as the modern Assamese script. 

Though the language is Sanskrit, there appear systematic Prakriticisms that indicate an underlying colloquial Indo-Aryan language, called Kamarupi Prakrit.

List of inscriptions

Notes

References

 
 
 

Indian inscriptions
Kamarupa (former kingdom)